Metanoia was a Christian death metal band that originated from Townsville, Queensland, Australia. The band formed in 1990 but disbanded in 2000. The band started as a vision of guitarist Steve Bennett's. The main members of the band consisted of husband and wife Steve (Guitars) and Lisa Bennett (Bass) and vocalist Justin 'Yowie' Smith.

Background
Metanoia formed in 1990 by Steve Bennett, with his wife Lisa (Spud) on bass, Dylan Speerstra on drums, and Yowie Smith on vocals. In 1996, the band saw the departure of Speerstra, who was replaced by Ian Northey. In 1998, Smith left the band and was replaced by Simon Pankhurst. The band dissolved in 2000.

Members

Last known line-up
 Ian Northey – drums (1996–1999)
 Simon "Psycho" Pankhurst – vocals (1998–1999)
 Lisa "Spud" Bennett – bass (1990–1999)
 Steve "Yak" Bennett – guitar (1990–1999), rhythm guitar (1999)

Former
 Dylan Speerstra – drums (1990–1996)
 Justin "Yowie" Smith – vocals (1994–1998)

Timeline

Discography

Studio albums
 In Darkness or in Light (1995)
 Don't Walk Dead (1998)
 Time to Die (1999)

Demos
 Demo (1990)
 Screaming Fetus (1994)
 Akeldama (1995)

Splits
 Australian Metal Compilation II - The Raise the Dead (1995)

References

Australian Christian metal musical groups
Musical groups established in 1990
Musical groups disestablished in 2000
Rowe Productions artists